Orenda Books is a British-based publishing house that publishes literary and crime fiction. The London-based publisher was established in 2014 and publishes debut and existing authors including Ragnar Jónasson, Thomas Enger, Michael Grothaus, Gunnar Staalesen, and Kati Hiekkapelto.

History 

Orenda Books was founded in 2014 by Karen Sullivan, the former managing editor at Arcadia Books. Sullivan left Arcadia following a strategic review of the company, which led to Arcadia's publishing list being reduced from fifteen books to only three. In its first year of operations Orenda published six titles, increasing that to sixteen titles in its second year. Sullivan has stated the name Orenda Books was inspired by the title of the Joseph Boyden novel The Orenda and Sullivan's Canadian heritage: "The word itself – which loosely translates as 'the mystical power that drives human accomplishment' – is a nod to my Canadian heritage and a First Nations word whose provenance is a tribe that settled in a part of Ontario where I've spent every summer of my life."

Titles 

 Deity by Matt Wesolowski
 There's Only One Danny Garvey by David F. Ross
 Winterkill by Ragnar Jónasson
 Fallen Angels by Gunnar Staalesen
 The Coral Bride by Roxanne Bouchard
 The Creak on the Stairs by Eva Björg Ægisdóttir
 Betrayal by Lilja Sigurðardóttir
 The Seven Doors by Agnes Ravatn
 A Song of Isolation by Michael J. Malone
 The Big Chill by Doug Johnstone
 Hinton Hollow Death Trip by Will Carver
 Ash Mountain by Helen FitzGerald
 The Waiting Rooms by Eve Smith
 Blood Red City by Rod Reynolds
 Sister by Kjell Ola Dahl
 I Am Dust by Louise Beech
 Containment by Vanda Symon
 Deep Dark Night by Steph Broadribb
 Mexico Street by Simone Buchholz
 Beast by Matt Wesolowski
 Death Deserved by Thomas Enger & Jorn Lier Horst
 A Dark Matter by Doug Johnstone
 The Last Stage by Louise Voss
 Violet by SJI Holliday
 Nothing Important Happened Today by Will Carver
 Blood Song by Johana Gustawsson
 In the Absence of Miracles by Michael J. Malone
 The Closer I Get by Paul Burston
 The Home by Sarah Stovell
 Turbulent Wake by Paul E. Hardisty
 Worst Case Scenario by Helen FitzGerald
 Breakers by Doug Johnstone
 The Ringmaster by Vanda Symon
 Call Me Star Girl by Louise Beech
 Welcome to the Heady Heights by David F. Ross
 Beton Rouge by Simone Buchholz
 Changeling by Matt Wesolowski
 Deep Dirty Truth by Steph Broadribb
 The Lingering by SJI Holliday
 Little Siberia by Antti Tuomainen
 Cage by Lilja Sigurðardóttir
 Inborn by Thomas Enger
 A Modern Family by Helga Flatland
 The Courier by Kjell Ola Dahl
 Wolves at the Door by Gunnar Staalesen
 Attend by West Camel
 Good Samaritans by Will Carver
 Trap by Lilja Sigurðardóttir
 After He Died by Michael J. Malone
 Palm Beach Finland by Antti Tuomainen
 The Lion Tamer Who Lost by Louise Beech]]
 Overkill by Vanda Symon
 Dead of Night by Michael Stanley
 Do No Harm by L V Hay
 Big Sister by Gunnar Staalesen
 Fault Lines by Doug Johnstone
 Absolution by Paul E. Hardisty
 The Old You by Louise Voss
 End Game by Matt Johnson
 The Ice Swimmer by Kjell Ola Dahl
 Keeper by Johana Gustawsson
 We Were the Salt of the Sea by Roxanne Bouchard
 Blue Night by Simone Buchholz
 Killed by Thomas Enger
 Hydra by Matt Wesolowski
 Deep Blue Trouble by Steph Broadribb
 CWA Mystery Tour by Multiple authors
 Whiteout by Ragnar Jónasson
 House of Spines by Michael J. Malone
 The Man Who Died by Antti Tuomainen
 Maria in the Moon by Louise Beech
 Snare by Lilja Sigurðardóttir
 The Other Twin by L V Hay
 Dying to Live by Michael Stanley
 Exquisite by Sarah Stovell
 Wolves in the Dark by Gunnar Staalesen
 Block 46 by Johana Gustawsson
 Reconciliation for the Dead by Paul E. Hardisty
 Deadly Game by Matt Johnson
 Cursed by Thomas Enger
 Six Stories by Matt Wesolowski
 Sealskin by Su Bristow
 Rupture by Ragnar Jónasson
 Deep Down Dead by Steph Broadribb
 The Mine by Antti Tuomainen
 The Exiled by Kati Hiekkapelto
 A Suitable Lie by Michael J. Malone
 Blackout by Ragnar Jónasson
 The Mountain in My Shoe by Louise Beech
 The Bird Tribunal by Agnes Ravatn
 Faithless by Kjell Ola Dahl
 A Death in the Family by Michael Stanley
 Deadly Harvest by Michael Stanley
 In Her Wake by Amanda Jennings
 Epiphany Jones by Michael Grothaus
 The Evolution of Fear by Paul E. Hardisty
 Wicked Game, 'Deadly Game and 'End Game by Matt Johnson
 The Rise & Fall of the Miraculous Vespas by David F. Ross
 Jihadi: A Love Story by  Yusuf Toropov 
 Where Roses Never Die by Gunnar Staalesen
 Nightblind by Ragnar Jónasson
 How To Be Brave by Louise Beech
 The Defenseless by Kati Hiekkapelto
 We Shall Inherit the Wind by Gunnar Staalesen
 Snowblind by Ragnar Jónasson
 The Last Days of Disco by David F. Ross
 The Abrupt Physics of Dying by Paul E. Hardisty

References

External links 
 Official website

Publishing companies of the United Kingdom